Ja sam rođen tamo na salašu (lit. I was born there on a farm), also known as Salaš u malom ritu (Салаш у малом риту, lit. The farm in little swamp), is a Serbian patriotic song from the province of Vojvodina. Some people consider this song as an unofficial anthem of Vojvodina. The song was used in TV series named "Salaš u Malom Ritu" (from 1975), which speaks about tragic World War II events in Vojvodina.

Lyrics

Serbian patriotic songs
Culture of Vojvodina
Cultural depictions of Serbian men